Postal district numbers for the addressing and sorting of mail were used in the suburban area of Melbourne, Victoria, Australia from February 1928 until their 1967 replacement by the Australia-wide postcodes. They were based on the London codes with a letter (or letters) denoting the direction from the main city post office and a number appended to, generally, correlate with the relative distance. An earlier system from around 1923 with twelve districts or 54 which had failed due to neglect was replaced.

Most postal districts were named from the post office from which delivery of mail was effected although a small number of districts contained no post offices. 99 districts were created and suburbs which were developed after 1928 were not allocated postal district numbers, the structure being retained substantially unchanged until 1967. The street directory issued in connection with the system allocated a postal district name and number to all streets in the metropolitan area.

The table below shows the district numbers used, the date being 1928 if a post office was open then or earlier. An asterisk identifies a name as a postal district.

See also
List of Melbourne suburbs

References

Melbourne-related lists
Postal codes of Australia